Leon Ware is a Leon Ware album released in 1982. This was his second self-titled album after his 1972 debut album. It was his final release for Elektra Records.

Background

Produced by Leon Ware and co-produced by Marty Paich, the album was a who's who of Los Angeles session players at the time.

Track listing
 Slippin' Away	(David Foster, David Paich, Leon Ware) 4:11
 Lost In Love With You	(Geoffrey Leib) 3:52
 Shelter (Allee Willis, Leon Ware)	3:56
 Why I Came To California (Janis Siegel, Leon Ware)	4:10
 Deeper Than Love (Leon Ware, Marcos Valle)	3:23
 Can I Touch You There (William Beck, Chet Willlis, James Williams, Leon Ware)	4:05
 Words Of Love	(Marti Sharron, Zenobia Conkerite) 4:35
 Miracles (Bill Champlin, Leon Ware)	4:06
 Somewhere (Laudir de Oliveira, Leon Ware, Marcos Valle)	4:15
 Where Are They Now (John Bettis, Richard Kerr)	4:21

Personnel

 Leon Ware – lead and background vocals
 David Foster, Marty Paich – electric piano
 Geoffrey Leib – electric piano & synth
 David Paich, Roland S. Burke – piano
 Gary Change – synth
 David T. Walker, Dean Parks, Steve Lukather – guitar
 Nathan East, Chuck Rainey, Abraham Laboriel – bass
 Jeff Porcaro, James Gadson – drums
 Lenny Castro, Laudier DeOliveira – percussion
 Eddie "Bongo" Brown – bongos
 Bill Champlin, Tamara Champlin, Bonnie Bramlett, Chris Bennett, Joann Harris, Rita Coolidge, Janis Siegel, Flora Purim – background vocals
 Kurt McGettrick, Gato Barbieri – saxophone
 Airto Moreira – backing Vocals, percussion

References

External links
 

1982 albums
Leon Ware albums
Albums produced by Leon Ware
Elektra Records albums